Thomas Roach may refer to:
 Tom Roach (footballer) (born 1985), Australian rules footballer
 Thomas Roach (Canadian politician) (1769–1833), merchant and politician in Nova Scotia
 Thomas Roach (mayor), mayor of White Plains, New York